John William H. Butt (1870–1931) was an English film actor of the silent era.

He was born in Bradford and died in North Bierley, West Yorkshire.

Selected filmography
 The Chimes (1914)
 Far from the Madding Crowd (1915)
 The Grand Babylon Hotel (1916)
 The Man Behind 'The Times' (1917)
 The American Heiress (1917)
 Carrots (1917)
 The Diamond Necklace (1921)
 The Skipper's Wooing (1922)
 Sam's Boy (1922)
 A Will and a Way (1922)
 No. 7 Brick Row (1922) 
 The Head of the Family (1922)
 The Monkey's Paw (1923)
 Lawyer Quince (1924)
 The Prehistoric Man (1924)
 Sen Yan's Devotion (1924)
 The Flying Fifty-Five (1924)
The Gold Cure (1925)
 Nell Gwyn (1926)
 Second to None (1927)
 Passion Island (1927)
 Carry On (1927)
 The Hellcat (1928)
 The Last Post (1929)
 A Peep Behind the Scenes (1929)
 The Clue of the New Pin (1929)
 The Informer (1929)

References

External links

1870 births
1931 deaths
20th-century English male actors
English male film actors
English male silent film actors